Only Ghosts is the third album by the American stoner metal band Red Fang, released in 2016 via Relapse Records.

Track list
All tracks written by Red Fang.

Personnel
Red Fang
Aaron Beam - bass, vocals, synthesizers
Maurice Bryan Giles - guitar, vocals
John Sherman - drums, percussion
David Sullivan - guitar, synthesizers

Production
Ross Robinson - production, engineering
Red Fang and Ross Robinson - arrangement
 Michael "Lightning" Balboa - engineering
Joe Barresi - mixing
Dave Collins - mastering

References

2016 albums
Red Fang albums
Relapse Records albums
Albums produced by Ross Robinson